Molly Jane McCook (born July 30, 1990) is an American stage and TV actress.  She played a leading role in Fox's Last Man Standing.

Early life
McCook was born on July 30, 1990, in Los Angeles.  She is daughter of actor John McCook and actress Laurette Spang.

Career
Early in her career, McCook had minor roles in television's 10 Things I Hate About You and Glee, both filmed in 2009 and released in 2010.  She acted in a five-episode arc of the soap opera, The Bold and the Beautiful, with her father, John, a series regular, in 2010.  McCook appeared that same year in the music video for "If Eyes Could Speak," a single released by Devon Werkheiser.  She also maintains a YouTube channel in which she displays her singing abilities.  

McCook has appeared in episodes of Monk, Hot in Cleveland, Glory Daze, and Free Agents.  

In 2012, McCook appeared as Madison Evans in a four episode arc of the short-lived, low-budget series, Never Fade Away.  That year, McCook also played Natalie in the horror film, Excision; and then once again joined her father in acting in the short film, Christmas Without You.

In 2013, she was in an episode of Agents of S.H.I.E.L.D.  and the following year in an episode of Modern Family.  McCook's character featured heavily in the web series, Guidance, in its inaugural season (2016).  She was in several episodes of The Ranch in 2016–2018.  Since 2019, McCook has appeared on the Freeform network in the recurring role of court clerk, Rebecca, in season one of the Good Trouble spin-off of The Fosters TV show.

In 2015, McCook originated the stage role of character Annette Hargrove in Cruel Intentions: The Musical in Los Angeles, the part played by Reese Witherspoon in the film.

From 2018 to 2021, she starred as the major character, middle daughter Mandy, in the last three seasons of Last Man Standing on the Fox Network, a role she inherited from Molly Ephraim after the show's hiatus and network switch in 2017-2018.

In 2021, McCook starred alongside her father in the Discovery+ produced film, Candy Coated Christmas.  The Christmas-themed movie appeared on the Food Network, a first for the broadcaster.

Personal life
She and Broadway actor John Krause were married on September 7, 2019.

Filmography

References

External links
 

1990 births
Living people
21st-century American actresses
Actresses from Los Angeles
American television actresses
American web series actresses